Tinne Van der Straeten (born 1 April 1978) is a Belgian politician who has been serving as Minister of Energy in the De Croo Government since October 2020. She is a member of the Groen party. She previously served in the Chamber of Representatives for Brussels-Halle-Vilvoorde from 2007 to 2010 and later for Brussels from 2019 until 2020, when she resigned to become energy minister.

Early life and education
In 2000, Van der Straeten obtained a degree in African Studies at Ghent University. Subsequently, she started working as a researcher at Université catholique de Louvain. After this, she went to KU Leuven, where she researched labour discrimination. After her studies, she joined Agalev and she was active in Malle. In 2008, she obtained a law degree at the Vrije Universiteit Brussel.

Political career
In the 2007 elections, Van der Straeten was elected a representative in the Belgian federal parliament for the first time. Three years later, in the 2010 elections, she wasn't re-elected. In 2018, Van der Straeten re-enters the political foreground. She becomes alderman of Public Works in Koekelberg and is a candidate for the 2019 federal elections on the Ecolo list in Brussels. She was re-elected as a representative. In her second passage in the Chamber, she worked out an agreement on the capacity remuneration mechanism.

Following the 2022 Russian invasion of Ukraine, Van der Straeten led her party's policy shift on extending the life-span of Belgium's remaining nuclear power plants. By July 2022, she reached an agreement in principle with energy provider Engie to extend the lifespan of two nuclear reactors — Doel 4 and Tihange 3 — by 10 years.

Timeline
10/06/2007 – 13/06/2010:  Representative (constituency of Brussels-Halle-Vilvoorde)

References

  3 questions à Tinne Van Der Straeten, La Libre 

1978 births
Living people
Groen (political party) politicians
Ghent University alumni
Vrije Universiteit Brussel alumni
People from Malle
21st-century Belgian politicians
21st-century Belgian women politicians
Women government ministers of Belgium
Government ministers of Belgium